Our Boys is an American-Israeli television miniseries created by Hagai Levi, Joseph Cedar, and Tawfik Abu-Wael. The series focuses on the story of the kidnapping and murder of Mohammed Abu Khdeir.

The ten-episode series premiered on August 12, 2019, on HBO. It is a co-production between HBO and Keshet Studios.

Cast
Shlomi Elkabetz as Simon
 Jony Arbid as Hussein Abu Khdeir
 Adam Gabay as Avishay Elbaz
 Or Ben-Melech as Yosef Haim Ben-David
 Ruba Blal Asfour as Suha Abu Khdeir
 Eyal Shikartzi as Yinon Edri
 Lior Ashkenazi as State Attorney deputy Uri Korb
 Jacob Cohen as Rabbi Shalom Ben-David
 Ram Masarweh as Mohammed Abu Khdeir
 Shadi Mar'i as Eyad Abu Khdeir

Premise 
The series begins with the kidnapping and murder of three Israeli teenagers, allegedly by Palestinian militants from Hamas. This then prompts a retaliation, which involves the kidnapping and murder of Mohammed Abu Khdeir (Masarweh). Three Jews carry out the attack, an adult and his two young relatives. Aside from the grief of the victims' families, the series also follows the investigation of Khdeir's murder and the tension that emerges among Jewish and the Arab community after the incident.

Episodes

Production
In October 2016, it was reported that HBO was creating a series on the 2014 kidnapping of 3 Israeli teens with Keshet International.
The series was filmed on location in Israel and directed by Israeli filmmaker Joseph Cedar and Palestinian writer and director Tawfik Abu Wael, who also co-created the series alongside showrunner Hagai Levi.

Reception
The review aggregator website Rotten Tomatoes reported a 92% approval rating with an average score of 7/10, based on 12 reviews. The website's critical consensus reads, "Challenging and thoughtful, Our Boys explores a real-world tragedy with grace and compassion." Metacritic, which uses a weighted average, assigned a score of 79 out of 100 based on eight critics, indicating "generally favorable reviews".

120 bereaved Israeli families sent a letter to HBO protesting the series, claiming that the show largely glosses over the murder of the three Israeli teens, and that there is a systemic difference in the societal treatment and acceptance of terrorism between Israelis and Palestinians. They demanded that HBO clarify that Palestinian terrorism is much more prevalent than Jewish terrorism. HBO declined to comply with the request.

Awards and nominations
The series won 14 Israeli Academy Awards including Best Drama Series Award, Best Actor for Johnny Arbid, Best Actress for Ruba Blal Asfour, Best Photography for Yaron Scharf, plus Best Direction and Best Screenplay for Hagai Levi, Joseph Cedar and Tawfik Abu Wael. Our Boys has also received nominations in the Entertainment category of the 2020 Peabody Awards and in the Foreign language category of the 2020 Multi-Ethnicity in Communications (NAMIC) Vision Awards.

Controversies
The critical issue that the series depicts sparked an emotional stir in the Palestinian Territories, and received extensive backlash from Israel. The story of a teenager, Muhammad Abu Khdeir, who was killed in 2014 brought back painful memories of the Palestinians and his family. Abu Khdeir's mother, Suha, said that the series brought her back to the day her son was kidnapped. "I wish I could reach into the screen and grab hold of my son," she said. 

Benjamin Netanyahu's son, Yair Netanyahu, argued that the series skewed reality and damaged Israel's image. He wrote on Twitter, "The series tells the whole world how the Israelis and Jews are cruel and bloodthirsty murderers, and how the Palestinians are badly done by and oppressed."

Prime minister Benjamin Netanyahu called the series "antisemitic" and called to boycott its co-producing Israeli channel 12. His criticism of the series was accompanied by other remarks towards the network after Netanyahu tried to stop its news department from airing leaked quotes from a legal investigation of his own suspected corruption, earlier the same day.

See also
Israeli television

References

External links

English-language television shows
2010s American drama television miniseries
2019 American television series debuts
2019 American television series endings
HBO original programming